Alessandro Fabian (born 7 January 1988) is an Italian triathlete.

Biography
At the 2012 Summer Olympics men's triathlon on Tuesday 7 August he placed tenth.

Fabian also competes in Super League Triathlon.

References

External links
 
 
  
 

1988 births
Living people
Italian male triathletes
Triathletes at the 2012 Summer Olympics
Triathletes at the 2016 Summer Olympics
Olympic triathletes of Italy
Triathletes of Centro Sportivo Carabinieri
20th-century Italian people
21st-century Italian people